Repulsae Nescia is a Latin phrase meaning "ignorant of defeat" in English. The longer phrase from Horace, Virtus Repulsae Nescia, is often translated as "courage knows no defeat".

History
It is found in Horace: Odes, III., 2, 17. The following passage:Virtus repulsae nescia sordidae
Intaminatis fulget honoribus,Nec sumit aut ponit securisArbitrio popularis aurae.was translated by Conington as:True Virtue never knows defeat:
Her robes she keeps unsullied still;Nor take, nor quits, her curule seat,To please a people's veering will.

Usage as a motto
Rockport School in Craigavad, Holywood, N. Ireland, founded 1906
Wofford College in Spartanburg, South Carolina, founded 1854 
Lasell College in Newton, Massachusetts, founded 1851
Gisborne Boys' High School in Gisborne, New Zealand, founded 1909
Gisborne Girls' High School in Gisborne, New Zealand, founded 1956

See also
List of mottos
List of university mottos

Notes and references

Latin mottos